Ricinelaidic acid or (+)-(R)-ricinelaidic acid is an unsaturated omega-9 trans fatty acid.  It is the trans-isomer of the fatty acid ricinoleic acid.

External links 
Information about ricinelaidic acid in Organic Syntheses

Fatty acids
Castor oil plant